Kurvinen is a Finnish surname. Notable people with the surname include:

Antti Kurvinen (born 1986), Finnish politician
Mikko Kurvinen (born 1979), Finnish ice hockey player

See also
Karvinen
Kervinen

Finnish-language surnames